Marine Almeida Friesen (born 5 February 1988) is a Brazilian Christian singer and songwriter.

Biography 
Marine Friesen was born in the city of Rio de Janeiro, she converted to Christianity in Sunday school. She studied at CTMDT, being one of the first school classes newly founded at the time. In March 2007, Marine was invited by singer Ana Paula Valadão joined the band Diante do Trono.

She married Daniel Friesen on November 22, 2008, their first child, David Friesen, was born in 2014.

Marine recorded her first album in 2015, the album Alfa & Ômega was recorded live in the Lagoinha Church.

Discography 

 Solo career
 Alfa & Ômega (2015)
 Alfa & Ômega (New version) (2016)
 Ressuscitou (2017)

 as member of Diante do Trono
 Príncipe da Paz - (2007)
 A Canção do Amor - (2008)
 Tua Visão - (2009)
 Aleluia - (2010)
 Sol da Justiça - (2011)
 Glória a Deus - (2012)
 Creio - (2012)
 Global Project Português - (2012)
 Renovo - (2013)
 Tu Reinas - (2014)
 Tetelestai - (2015)
 Deus Reina - (2015)

References

External links
 

1988 births
Living people
Brazilian women singer-songwriters
Brazilian singer-songwriters
Christian music songwriters
Brazilian gospel singers
Musicians from Rio de Janeiro (city)
Portuguese-language singers
Brazilian evangelicals
Brazilian Christians
Performers of contemporary worship music
21st-century Brazilian singers
21st-century Brazilian women singers